The 2018–19 NCAA Division I women's basketball season began in November 2018 and concluded with the Final Four title game at Amalie Arena in Tampa, Florida in April 2019. Practices officially began in September 2018.

Season headlines
 June 18 – Purdue University Fort Wayne (PFW), which was set to begin operation on July 1 following the dissolution of Indiana University – Purdue University Fort Wayne (IPFW), announced that the athletic program that it would inherit from IPFW, previously known as the Fort Wayne Mastodons, would become the Purdue Fort Wayne Mastodons. PFW also changed its colors from IPFW's former blue and silver scheme to the old gold and black used by its new parent institution.
 September 10 – The Northeast Conference (NEC) announced that Merrimack College would start a transition from the NCAA Division II Northeast-10 Conference and join the NEC effective July 1, 2019. The Warriors will not be eligible for the NCAA tournament until becoming a full D-I member in 2023–24.
 October 3 – Long Island University announced that it would merge its two current athletic programs—the LIU Brooklyn Blackbirds, full members of the NEC, and the Division II LIU Post Pioneers—effective with the 2019–20 school year. The new program will compete under the LIU name with a new nickname and retain LIU Brooklyn's Division I and NEC memberships. This change had minimal effect on the then-existing LIU Brooklyn women's basketball program, as LIU has announced that the unified basketball team will be based at the Brooklyn campus.
 November 1 – The Associated Press preseason All-America team was released. The leading vote-getters were two guards, Louisville's Asia Durr and Oregon's Sabrina Ionescu, each with 29 of 31 votes. Joining them on the team were Connecticut forward Katie Lou Samuelson (28), Notre Dame guard Arike Ogunbowale (24),  and Baylor center Kalani Brown (18). Ionescu was the only junior named; all others were seniors.
 January 11 – The Western Athletic Conference announced that Dixie State University would start a transition from Division II to D I and join the conference in July 2020.
 February 19 – Less than 12 hours after leading Georgia to a 78–56 win over Ole Miss, Lady Bulldogs head coach Joni Taylor gave birth to a daughter. Top assistant Karen Lange was named as interim head coach for what was intended to be a maternity leave, but Taylor returned to the bench for Georgia's next game on February 21.
 February 24 – Rutgers announced that head coach C. Vivian Stringer, who had missed the Scarlet Knights' game at Michigan on February 21, would take a leave for the rest of the regular season on medical advice. Stringer was initially expected to return after the Big Ten tournament, with assistant Tim Eatman serving as interim coach. However, Rutgers announced on March 15 that Stringer would not return for a likely NCAA tournament run, again on medical advice. She ultimately returned for the 2019–20 season.
 February 27 – Georgia Tech placed head coach MaChelle Joseph on administrative leave, saying in a press release that it was a "pending personnel matter", named assistant Mark Simons as interim head coach, and made no further comment on the situation. The following day, Joseph's attorney charged that the Tech athletic department had taken the action as retaliation for raising Title IX concerns within the department. Joseph would ultimately be fired (see "Coaching changes" section below).
 March 26 – The Cincinnati Enquirer reported allegations that Northern Kentucky head coach Camryn Whitaker had engaged in systematic bullying and emotional abuse of players. The previous day, the team's only senior, Taryn Taugher, published an account of her experiences on the Odyssey web platform, claiming that the university knew about Whitaker's behavior but did not address it. The Enquirer received confirmation of Taugher's account in interviews with the parents of another player, plus social media posts from multiple teammates. The university told the Enquirer that it was investigating the claims, but Taugher said that she had yet to be contacted by any administrator. On April 2, a former NKU player, Shar'Rae Davis, provided an Enquirer reporter with her own allegations, charging that Whitaker had used Davis' medical condition of ulcerative colitis to punish both her and other team members. In the interim, eight current Norse players published an open letter in Odyssey backing Whitaker.
 April 1 – North Carolina placed the entire women's coaching staff, including head coach Sylvia Hatchell, on paid administrative leave while an outside firm hired by the university reviewed the state of the program, due to what the university called "issues raised by student-athletes and others." On April 4, The Washington Post reported that among the issues were allegations that Hatchell forced several players to play through serious injuries and made a number of racially offensive remarks. Hatchell would resign following the review (see "Coaching changes" section below).
 April 6 – Sabrina Ionescu announced in The Players' Tribune that she would return for her senior season at Oregon in 2019–20. Because she turned 22 in December 2019, she had been eligible to declare for the 2019 WNBA draft.

Milestones and records
 November 13 – Rutgers head coach C. Vivian Stringer became the sixth college women's coach with 1,000 career wins following the Scarlet Knights' 73–44 pasting of Central Connecticut. She also became the first African-American college coach to reach the milestone.
 November 18 – Sabrina Ionescu recorded her 12th career triple-double in Oregon's 102–82 win over Buffalo. Already the holder of the all-divisions NCAA women's record for career triple-doubles, Ionescu equaled the NCAA record for all players regardless of sex, previously held by former BYU men's player Kyle Collinsworth.
 December 17 and 20 – Chastadie Barrs of Lamar became the first Division I player of either sex ever to record triple-doubles in consecutive games twice in her career. First, Barrs recorded 20 points, 12 rebounds, and 10 steals in the Cardinals' 93–37 blowout of Division III Howard Payne. She followed this with 23 points, 10 rebounds, and 10 steals in the Cardinals' 82–66 win over Pacific. Barrs had recorded consecutive triple-doubles early in the 2017–18 season.
 December 20 – Ionescu took sole possession of the aforementioned career triple-double record, recording her 13th with 17 points, 11 rebounds, and 13 assists in Oregon's 82–36 win over Air Force.
 December 21 – In Oregon's next game, a 115–69 blowout of UC Irvine, Ionescu recorded her 14th triple-double with 14 points, 10 rebounds, and 13 assists. This marked the second time in her career that she recorded triple-doubles in consecutive games, matching Barrs' accomplishment from the night before. Like Barrs, Ionescu had recorded consecutive triple-doubles early in the 2017–18 season—with the second game in that streak also coming the night after the second of Barrs' corresponding streak.
 January 3 – Baylor defeated then top-ranked UConn 68–57. This was the Huskies' first regular-season loss since November 2014, and ended their NCAA-record regular-season winning streak at 126 games.
 January 9, 12, and 16 – Barrs accomplished three major triple-double milestones—becoming the first Division I player of either sex ever to record triple-doubles in consecutive games twice in a single season, the first to do so three times in a career, and the second player in any NCAA division to have recorded three consecutive triple-doubles. First, Barrs recorded 17 points, 10 rebounds, and 12 steals in the Cardinals' 79–59 win over New Orleans. She followed this with 10 points, 11 rebounds, and 10 assists in the Cardinals' 57–37 win over Central Arkansas. Finally, Barrs had 15 points, 10 rebounds, and 11 assists in Lamar's 94–54 pasting of Southeastern Louisiana. The only other player with three straight triple-doubles was Danielle Carson of Youngstown State, who accomplished this feat in the 1985–86 season.
 January 20 – Ionescu recorded her sixth triple-double of the season with 21 points, 12 rebounds, and 12 assists in Oregon's 93–60 win over Arizona. This tied the all-time NCAA record for triple-doubles in a season, originally set in women's basketball by the aforementioned Danielle Carson in 1985–86 and equaled by Ionescu herself in 2017–18. (In men's basketball, the aforementioned Kyle Collinsworth had the same total in both 2014–15 and 2015–16.)
 February 2 – Shakyla Hill of Grambling State had 21 points, 16 rebounds, 13 assists, and 10 steals in the Tigers' 77–57 win over Arkansas–Pine Bluff, making her the first Division I player of either sex to record two quadruple-doubles in a career. Hill had previously recorded one in January 2018.
 February 24 – Ionescu took sole possession of the all-time NCAA record for triple-doubles in a season, recording her seventh of the season with 13 points, 12 rebounds, and 13 assists in Oregon's 96–78 win over USC.
 February 27 – In Lamar's 97–49 blowout of Houston Baptist, Barrs collected 10 steals to give her the record for career steals in Division I women's basketball. She ended the game with 627, surpassing the previous record of 624 by Natalie White of Florida A&M (1991–95).
 March 3 – In the final regular-season game of her college career, California center Kristine Anigwe scored 32 points and claimed 30 rebounds in the Golden Bears' 80–58 win over Washington State. Anigwe's performance, which equaled the Pac-12 record for single-game rebounds, was the first Division I women's 30–30 game since Jennifer Butler accomplished the feat for UMass on December 28, 2002. Anigwe also joined former Oklahoma center Courtney Paris as the only women in Division I history to record 30 consecutive double-doubles.
 March 24 – In Oregon's 91–68 win over Indiana in the second round of the NCAA tournament, Ionescu became only the second player to record multiple triple-doubles in NCAA tournament play, collecting 29 points, 10 rebounds, and 12 assists. Ionescu, who had a triple-double in the first round of the 2018 tournament, joined former Stanford star Nicole Powell, who had consecutive triple-doubles in 2002, as the only Division I women's players with two triple-doubles in tournament play. Ionescu extended her all-divisions NCAA records for triple-doubles to 8 in a season and 18 in a career. At the time, it was speculated that Ionescu could be playing her last home game, but she ultimately announced she would return to Oregon for her senior season.

Notes

Conference membership changes
Six schools joined new conferences for the 2018–19 season. Four schools switched between Division I conferences for the 2018–19 season. In addition, two schools moved from Division II starting this season. The former Division II schools are ineligible for NCAA-sponsored postseason play until completing their D-I transitions in 2022.

In addition to the schools changing conferences, the 2018–19 season was the last for Savannah State in D-I with its decision to reclassify all of its sports to D-II.

Finally, one D-I member adopted a new institutional and athletic identity. The 2017–18 school year was the last for Indiana University – Purdue University Fort Wayne (IPFW) as a single institution. Following the school's split into separate institutions governed by Indiana University and Purdue University, IPFW degree programs in health sciences are now overseen by Indiana University Fort Wayne, while all other degree programs are governed by Purdue University Fort Wayne (PFW). As noted in the "Season headlines" section, the IPFW athletic program, rebranded in 2016 as the Fort Wayne Mastodons, became the Purdue Fort Wayne Mastodons, representing only PFW.

Arenas

New arenas 
 Elon opened the Schar Center, which replaced their home of 37 seasons, Alumni Gym.
 After 32 seasons at the off-campus Burton Coliseum, McNeese State opened the new on-campus Health and Human Performance Education Complex (H&HP Complex).
 The two new Division I entries for 2018 continued to play at existing on-campus facilities. California Baptist plays at the CBU Events Center, which opened in 2017, and North Alabama plays at Flowers Hall, which opened in 1972 and has been home to the women's program since it began play in 1975.

Arenas reopening
Four teams returned to newly renovated arenas, all of which were closed for the 2017–18 season.
 Cincinnati returned to Fifth Third Arena.
 Houston initially planned to reopen the renamed Fertitta Center (originally Hofheinz Pavilion) by the start of the 2018–19 season, but construction delays pushed the final reopening date to December 1, with Houston's men officially reopening the facility. The women's first game after the reopening was on December 6.
 Northwestern returned to Welsh–Ryan Arena.
 Villanova returned to the renamed Finneran Pavilion (originally duPont Pavilion and later The Pavilion).

Arenas closing

Temporary arenas
Houston began the 2018–19 season at Texas Southern's Health and Physical Education Arena, where the Cougars played most of their 2017–18 home games. The women played three home games at Texas Southern before moving into Fertitta Center.

Robert Morris planned to open the new UPMC Events Center on the site of its former on-campus Sewall Center in January 2019, but the opening has now been delayed to that summer. Until the new arena opens, the Colonials will continue to use the Student Recreation and Fitness Center, a building in the school's North Athletic Complex that opened in September 2017 as part of the UPMC Events Center project.

Season outlook

Preseason  polls

 
The top 25 from the AP and USA Today Coaches Polls.

Regular season

Early season tournaments

Upsets
An upset is a victory by an underdog team. In the context of NCAA Division I Women's Basketball, this generally constitutes an unranked team defeating a team currently ranked in the Top 25. This list will highlight those upsets of ranked teams by unranked teams as well as upsets of #1 teams. Rankings are from the AP poll.
Bold type indicates winning teams in "true road games"—i.e., those played on an opponent's home court (including secondary homes).

Conference winners and tournament winners
Each of the 32 Division I athletic conferences ends its regular season with a single-elimination tournament. The team with the best regular-season record in each conference is given the number one seed in each tournament, with tiebreakers used as needed in the case of ties for the top seeding. The winners of these tournaments receive automatic invitations to the 2019 NCAA Division I women's basketball tournament.

Statistical leaders

Postseason

NCAA tournament

Tournament upsets
For this list, an "upset" is defined as a win by a team seeded 7 or more spots below its defeated opponent.

Final Four – Amalie Arena, Tampa, FL

Women's NIT

Women's Basketball Invitational

Conference standings

Award winners

All-America teams

The NCAA has never recognized a consensus All-America team in women's basketball. This differs from the practice in men's basketball, in which the NCAA uses a combination of selections by the Associated Press (AP), the National Association of Basketball Coaches (NABC), the Sporting News, and the United States Basketball Writers Association (USBWA) to determine a consensus All-America team. The selection of a consensus team is possible because all four organizations select at least a first and second team, with only the USBWA not selecting a third team.
 
Before the 2017–18 season, it was impossible for a consensus women's All-America team to be determined because the AP had been the only body that divided its women's selections into separate teams. The USBWA first named separate teams in 2017–18. The women's counterpart to the NABC, the Women's Basketball Coaches Association (WBCA), continues the USBWA's former practice of selecting a single 10-member (plus ties) team. The NCAA does not recognize Sporting News as an All-America selector in women's basketball.

Major player of the year awards
Wooden Award: Sabrina Ionescu, Oregon
Naismith Award: Megan Gustafson, Iowa
Associated Press Player of the Year: Megan Gustafson, Iowa
Wade Trophy: Sabrina Ionescu, Oregon
Ann Meyers Drysdale Women's Player of the Year (USBWA): Megan Gustafson, Iowa
espnW National Player of the Year: Megan Gustafson, Iowa

Major freshman of the year awards
USBWA National Freshman of the Year: Rhyne Howard, Kentucky
 WBCA Freshman of the Year: Rhyne Howard, Kentucky
 espnW Freshman of the Year: Rhyne Howard, Kentucky

Major coach of the year awards
Associated Press Coach of the Year: Kim Mulkey, Baylor
Naismith College Coach of the Year: Lisa Bluder, Iowa
WBCA National Coach of the Year: Kim Mulkey, Baylor
 espnW Coach of the Year: Vic Schaefer, Mississippi State

Other major awards
Nancy Lieberman Award (top point guard): Sabrina Ionescu, Oregon
Ann Meyers Drysdale Award (top shooting guard): Asia Durr, Louisville
Cheryl Miller Award (top small forward): Bridget Carleton, Iowa State
Katrina McClain Award (top power forward): Napheesa Collier, UConn
Lisa Leslie Award (top center): Megan Gustafson, Iowa
 WBCA Defensive Player of the Year: Teaira McCowan, Mississippi State
 Naismith Women's Defensive Player of the Year: Kristine Anigwe, California
Senior CLASS Award (top senior on and off the court): Megan Gustafson, Iowa
Maggie Dixon Award (top rookie head coach): Carlos Funchess, Southern
Academic All-American of the Year (top scholar-athlete): Mikayla Ferenz, Idaho
Elite 90 Award (top GPA among upperclass players at Final Four): Nicole Benz, Notre Dame and Lauren Cox, Baylor
Pat Summitt Most Courageous Award: David Six, Hampton head coach

Coaching changes
Several teams changed coaches during and after the season.

See also

2018–19 NCAA Division I men's basketball season

Footnotes

References